Sunayna may refer to:

 Sunayna Kuruvilla (born 1999), Indian squash player
 Sunayna Wahi (born 1990), Surinamese sprinter
 INS Sunayna (P57), Indian ship